Chrysendeton imitabilis is a moth in the family Crambidae. It was described by Harrison Gray Dyar Jr. in 1917. It is found in North America, from Pennsylvania to Florida and west to Illinois.

Adults are on wing from April throughout the summer.

References

Acentropinae
Moths described in 1917